Clench Ruben Loufilou Ndella (born 12 April 1999) is a Gabonese international footballer who plays for French club AC Ajaccio, as a midfielder.

Career
He began his career with Mangasport. After spending time on trial with French club Ajaccio throughout August 2019, he signed a one-year contract with the club on 2 September 2019.

He made his international debut for Gabon in 2018.

References

External links

1999 births
Living people
Gabonese footballers
Gabonese expatriate footballers
Gabon international footballers
AS Mangasport players
AC Ajaccio players
Ligue 2 players
Championnat National 3 players
Association football midfielders
Gabonese expatriate sportspeople in France
Expatriate footballers in France
21st-century Gabonese people